Ryuthela tanikawai is a species of spider in the family Liphistiidae.

See also 
 List of Liphistiidae species#Ryuthela

References

External links 
 Ryuthela tanikawai. ITIS Report.
 Ryuthela tanikawai. ARCTOS Database.
 Ryuthela tanikawai. GWannon Species Database.

Liphistiidae
Spiders of Asia
Spiders described in 1997